Aechmea lamarchei is a plant species in the genus Aechmea, endemic to the eastern Brazilian states Minas Gerais and Espírito Santo.

Cultivars
 Aechmea 'Fulgo-Lamarchei'

References

lamarchei
Flora of Brazil
Plants described in 1892